José de Zúñiga (1755–after 1806) was a soldier and early California and Arizona settler.

Biography 
Zúñiga was born 1755 in Cuautitlán, near Mexico City, to Spanish parents.
He enlisted on October 18, 1772 as an officer trainee in the frontier army.
He initially served on the Texas frontier.
In 1780 he was promoted to lieutenant while stationed at the Presidio of San Carlos de Cerro Gordo, in the remote Big Bend Country.

In 1781 Lt. Zúñiga led his troops to Mission San Gabriel.
He became Commandant
of the Presidio of San Diego on
September 8, 1781 and served in that post 12 years, until October 19, 1793.
While there, he had cordial relations with his men, the Indians, his superiors, and missionaries.
In 1782 Zúñiga laid a road from San Diego Bay to the presidio.

That same year he also built the Presidio chapel.
He was its carpenter, mason, and painter for the chapel.
He also ordered a statue of the Immaculate Conception (which is now at Mission San Luis Rey).
In a letter to his mother in Mexico City, he proudly described the chapel and sent money to purchase "carmine, vermillion and other painting materials", garden and flower seeds, and to send any Dramas she can spare to read.
In 1784, Zúñiga  became a member of the third order of Franciscans.

Zúñiga had a reputation for honesty. He also served as quartermaster/paymaster and his books were always in order. He found a deficit in the books for $7000. The previous quartermaster/paymaster, Rafael Pedro y Gil, was arrested and sent to San Blas, Nayarit.

On May 19, 1792 Zúñiga was promoted to captain and assigned to the Presidio of Tucson, but had to wait until 1793 until his successor for San Diego arrived.
After detached duty in Monterey, Züñiga  arrived in Tucson in 1794.
Zúñiga blazed a trail between Tucson and the Zuni pueblos in 1795, but
Apache hostilities prevented that route from becoming well-traveled. 
During 1804–1806 Zúñiga was the commander at Tucson.  He later served at Arizpe, and retired as lieutenant colonel and Adjutant Inspector of Presidios.

Züñiga had at least two sons. His son Ignacio was born in 1796 in Tucson.
He had a previous son born 1783 as the result of an affair with Teresa Morillo, wife of an enlisted man, Manuel Nieto.

See also
 Bancroft, Hubert Howe, The History of California (1884) Vol I. 1542-1800, pp. 451–452, 645-656
 "Don Joseph de Zuniga Second Commandant of the San Diego Presidio" (Santa Barbara Trust for Historic Preservation)

1755 births
Year of death missing
People from Cuautitlán
People from San Diego
Paymasters
People of Alta California
People in colonial Arizona
Californios